The United States International Development Finance Corporation (DFC) is a development finance institution and agency of the United States federal government. DFC invests in development projects primarily in lower and middle-income countries. First authorized on 5 October 2018 by the BUILD Act, the independent agency was formed on 20 December 2019 by merging the Overseas Private Investment Corporation (OPIC) with the Development Credit Authority (DCA) of the United States Agency for International Development (USAID), as well as with several other smaller offices and funds.

DFC's lending capacity is used to provide loans, loan guarantees, direct equity investments, and political risk insurance for private-sector led development projects, feasibility studies, and technical assistance. DFC invests across several sectors including energy, healthcare, critical infrastructure, and technology, with stated priorities of women's empowerment, innovation, investment in West Africa and the Western Hemisphere, and climate change. As with the OPIC, the DFC is predominately self-funded through the fees and interest collected during its regular operations.

History 
U.S. development finance efforts were consolidated under the Overseas Private Investment Corporation (OPIC) in 1969 by President Richard Nixon, transferring responsibility from the United States Agency for International Development (USAID). The goal was to promote a more business-like management of development finance policy. In the 2010s, the Obama administration came to support a further consolidation of U.S. development finance in light of the increasing Chinese investment in the developing world (particularly through the Belt and Road Initiative).

The Trump administration originally opposed OPIC, and its proposed 2018 budget had called for the elimination of OPIC altogether, but advocacy by some administration officials, Senators, and others convinced the White House to support the consolidation of OPIC and development finance efforts in line with the President's policy priorities. Relevant legislation — the Better Utilization of Investments Leading to Development (BUILD) Act — was introduced in Congress to establish the DFC shortly thereafter.

The BUILD Act 
The BUILD Act was introduced in the House and Senate in February 2018 with broad bipartisan support, based on proposals drafted by researchers at the Center for Global Development. It passed the Senate as a part of a bill to reauthorize the Federal Aviation Administration on a vote of 93–6 in early October 2018; it had already been passed in the House. It was signed into law by President Trump on October 5.

Concern over Chinese investment abroad and the inability for existing U.S. developmental finance institutions to keep up was a major factor pushing the passage of the Act, and the establishment of the DFC has widely been viewed as means to counter China, particularly its Belt and Road Initiative.

The Act aimed to ameliorate deficiencies in existing U.S. development finance policy, particularly restrictions on OPIC's actions. Compared to OPIC, the BUILD Act eases requirements of U.S. citizenship for parties to a given investment pursued by the DFC; allows the DFC to hold equity (rather than only make loans); allows the DFC to take on a greater risk burden than OPIC could for a given project; and allows the DFC to make loans in local currencies. DFC's total spending cap for its investments was also raised to $60 billion, compared to $29 billion for OPIC.

Investments and priorities 
DFC invests in sectors that include sanitation, infrastructure, healthcare, and food security. The DFC lists innovation, sustainable jobs, workers' protection, women's economic empowerment, and bolstering global supply chains as broader themes in its investment priorities. The DFC states that its investments aim to advance global development, U.S. foreign policy, and U.S. taxpayer interests.

Specific initiatives of the DFC include the 2X Women’s Initiative, inherited from OPIC, that focuses on women-owned businesses and/or products and services designed to empower women. DFC has collaborated with USAID and other U.S. agencies in the Power Africa program, which has facilitated power sector deals across the continent, and the Prosper Africa Initiative, launched in 2018 with the goal of promoting U.S.-Africa investment and trade, countering Chinese influence.

Response to COVID-19 
On May 14, 2020, President Trump signed an Executive Order which delegates authority to the DFC Chief Executive Officer to make loans to private institutions to support the response to COVID-19 or strengthen relevant supply chains. Trump administration, through DFC, announced that it planned to give Kodak a $765 million loan for manufacturing ingredients used in pharmaceuticals, in order to rebuild the national stockpile depleted by the COVID-19 pandemic and reduce dependency on foreign factories. The funding was put on hold as the U.S. Securities and Exchange Commission began probing allegations of insider trading by Kodak executives ahead of the deal's announcement, and DFC's inspector general announced scrutiny into the loan terms. The agency received criticism for the loan deal. 
The agency has given millions of dollars to ApiJect Systems.

Leadership 

DFC was led by Adam S. Boehler, the agency's first Chief Executive Officer. His nomination to lead the agency was announced by the Trump administration on July 10, 2019 and unanimously confirmed by the Senate on September 26, 2019. As of February 2022, Scott Nathan is the current CEO.

Reception 

Commentators have criticised the DFC's investments in upper-middle-income countries that are apparently intended to achieve U.S. foreign policy objectives other than international development, describing these investments as mission creep. Scott Morris of the Center for Global Development has criticised federal budget rules that require the DFC to treat equity investments as expenditures "with no offsetting allowance for [their] expected financial returns," unlike loans, which are budgeted based on their subsidy costs.

See also 
 Export–Import Bank of the United States

References

External links

 Official website

2019 establishments in the United States
Government agencies established in 2019
Government agencies of the United States
Agencies of the United States government
Independent agencies of the United States government
Government-owned companies of the United States
Corporations chartered by the United States Congress
Development finance institutions